Enrico Dandolo may refer to:

 Enrico Dandolo (d. 1205), 42nd Doge of Venice from 1192 until his death
 Enrico Dandolo (patriarch) (d. 1182), uncle of the doge and patriarch of Grado, Italy, from 1133 to 1182
 Enrico Dandolo (patriot) (1827–1849) an important figure in the Italian Risorgimento, participating in several of its most important battles
 Italian ironclad Enrico Dandolo A battleship of the Italian Navy, named after the Doge